A. F. Salahuddin Ahmed (24 September 1924 – 19 October 2014) was a Bangladeshi historian, humanist and rationalist thinker.

Early life and education 
Ahmed was born in Motihari, Bihar. He came from a Bengali Muslim family. His father Abu Ahmed Faizul Mohi, paternal grandfather Moulvi Ahmed, one of the early Bengali Muslim who was a high-ranking administrator in British India, and his maternal grandfather Azizul Haque, (who is credited with having a major contribution to the development of Henry Classification System of fingerprint method) were all students of the renowned  Presidency College, Calcutta.

He received his I.A. from Surendranath College, (formerly Ripon College), and B.A. (Hons.) in history from Presidency College (now Presidency University). He completed his first M.A. in history from Calcutta University, and then a second M.A. in history from University of Pennsylvania, and his PhD in history from the School of Oriental and African Studies at University of London (1961).

Professional career
Ahmed started his teaching career in 1948 as a lecturer at Jagannath College, Dhaka. Later, he was a lecturer, reader, and then professor of history at Rajshahi University. He was also a professor of history at Jahangir Nagar University and Dhaka University, the job from which he retired in 1984. In 1963, Ahmed was invited by the American Historical Association as a visiting lecturer in South Asian history at the University of Pennsylvania and the University of Chicago. He was also UNESCO Cultural Fellow at Kyoto University, Japan in 1956. Ahmed was also associated with Independent University, Bangladesh as Professor of National Culture and Heritage, and served as the president of the National Association of Social Sciences of Bangladesh, and chairman of the United Nations Association of Bangladesh.

Personal life

Ahmed married Hamida Khanom, who was one of the very few early Muslim graduates (I.A. and B.A.) from Bethune College, Calcutta. She completed her M.A. from Calcutta University, and then a second B.A. (Hons.) from University College London. She retired as Principal of Home Economics College, Dhaka. Hamida provided support and inspiration to Ahmed in his professional career throughout their long 60 years of married life.

Publications
The following quote from the review of one of Ahmed's book: Perspectives on History, Society and Politics published by Readers Service, Kolkata, 2001, aptly captures his views and reputation

In 2012, Ahmed contributed a chapter, entitled "Bangladesh, Present, and Future Prospects" in a memorial book in honor of his younger deceased brother, Fakhruddin Ahmed, a career diplomat, and twice Foreign Secretary of Bangladesh, titled, Regional Cooperation and Globalization: Bangladesh, South Asia and Beyond edited by Dr. Zillur Rahman Khan and Dr. Meghna Guha Thakurta, where he makes a case for appreciating historical perspectives of social and political events:

In 2004, Ahmed in collaboration with Bazlul Momin Choudhury, published a comprehensive editorial volume on the history of Bangladesh, entitled Bangladesh:National Culture and Heritage: An Introductory Reader, which gives an overview of the land, society, culture and religions, and history of the peoples of Bangladesh.

Some other notable books in English and Bengali written by Ahmed are:

 Social ideas and social change in Bengal 1818-18-35
 Bangladesh Tradition and Transformation, Bengali Nationalism and the Emergence of Bangladesh
 Itihash O oitijjo Bangalir Sadhana O Bhangalir Muktijuddha
 Bangladesh Jatiyabad, Swadhinata, Gonotantro

He has also contributed many articles in professional journals.

Social activities
Ahmed's interest and involvement in social service is reflected by his work for the Red Cross during the turbulent period of Partition of India, and his association with the Radical Democratic Party founded by M.N.Roy, and his active involvement in Ahmed Memorial Foundation established by family members dedicated to the educational and social welfare of their ancestral village of Bashbaria in Faridpur, Bangladesh. He maintained an active life until the day he died, serving as the National Professor, writing and publishing articles, giving media interviews.  He maintained worldwide contacts with his students, and professional acquaintances, as well as with their children and grandchildren, as many of them continued to seek him out for advise and support, as did his own family, and his house served as intellectual, social, and family gathering place during his lifetime.

Awards
 Ekushey Padak (1991). 
 Bangladesh Sadhinota Padak (Independence Day Award), (1999).
 National Professor Appointed by the Government of Bangladesh, 2011

References

Bengali historians
Historians of South Asia
Surendranath College alumni
Presidency University, Kolkata alumni
University of Calcutta alumni
Academic staff of the University of Dhaka
1924 births
2014 deaths
20th-century Indian Muslims
Recipients of the Ekushey Padak
Recipients of the Independence Day Award
National Professors of Bangladesh
Bangladeshi Muslims
Honorary Fellows of Bangla Academy